Mike Sears (born 28 February 1967) is a New Zealand cricketer. He played in twenty first-class and thirteen List A matches for Wellington from 1990 to 1994.

See also
 List of Wellington representative cricketers

References

External links
 

1967 births
Living people
New Zealand cricketers
Wellington cricketers
Cricketers from Auckland